Pertoltice may refer to several places in the Czech Republic:
 Pertoltice (Kutná Hora District), village in Kutná Hora District
 Pertoltice (Liberec District), village in Liberec District
 Pertoltice pod Ralskem, village in Česká Lípa District